Helhoek is a hamlet in the Dutch province of South Holland. It is a part of the municipality of Voorne aan Zee, and lies about 8 km north of Hellevoetsluis.

The statistical area "Helhoek", which also can include the surrounding countryside, has a population of around 50.

References
 

Populated places in South Holland
Voorne aan Zee